The 64th New York State Legislature, consisting of the New York State Senate and the New York State Assembly, met from January 5 to May 25, 1841, during the third year of William H. Seward's governorship, in Albany.

Background
Under the provisions of the New York Constitution of 1821, 32 Senators were elected on general tickets in eight senatorial districts for four-year terms. They were divided into four classes, and every year eight Senate seats came up for election. Assemblymen were elected countywide on general tickets to a one-year term, the whole Assembly being renewed annually.

At this time there were two political parties: the Democratic Party and the Whig Party.

On September 2, the Democratic state convention met at Syracuse, and nominated William C. Bouck for governor, and State Senator Daniel S. Dickinson for lieutenant governor.

The Whig state convention nominated Gov. Seward and Lt. Gov. Bradish for re-election.

Elections
The State election was held from November 2 to 4, 1840. Gov. William H. Seward and Lt. Gov. Luther Bradish were re-elected. Also, the Whig electoral ticket won, and New York's 42 electoral votes were cast for William Henry Harrison and John Tyler.

State Senator Samuel Works (8th D.) was re-elected.

Sessions
The Legislature met for the regular session at the Old State Capitol in Albany on January 5, 1841; and the Assembly adjourned on May 25, the Senate on May 26.

Peter B. Porter, Jr. (W) was elected Speaker with 65 votes against 60 for Levi S. Chatfield (D).

On January 27, the Legislature elected John A. Collier (W) to succeed Bates Cooke (W) as State Comptroller.

The Legislature re-elected State Treasurer Jacob Haight (W), and Surveyor General Orville L. Holley.

In February, the Governor and Senate removed Robert H. Morris from the office of Recorder of New York City. Three months later Morris was elected Mayor of New York City.

On May 19, Wyoming County was split from Genesee County, and was apportioned two seats in the Assembly. Genesee County remained with the other two seats.

State Senate

Districts
 The First District (4 seats) consisted of Kings, New York and Richmond counties.
 The Second District (4 seats) consisted of Dutchess, Orange, Putnam, Queens, Rockland, Suffolk, Sullivan, Ulster and Westchester counties.
 The Third District (4 seats) consisted of Albany, Columbia, Delaware, Greene, Rensselaer, Schenectady and Schoharie counties.
 The Fourth District (4 seats) consisted of Clinton, Essex, Franklin, Fulton, Hamilton, Herkimer, Montgomery, St. Lawrence, Saratoga, Warren and Washington counties.
 The Fifth District (4 seats) consisted of Jefferson, Lewis, Madison, Oneida, Oswego and Otsego counties.
 The Sixth District (4 seats) consisted of Allegany, Broome, Cattaraugus, Chemung, Chenango, Livingston, Steuben, Tioga and Tompkins counties.
 The Seventh District (4 seats) consisted of Cayuga, Cortland, Onondaga, Ontario, Seneca, Wayne and Yates counties.
 The Eighth District (4 seats) consisted of Chautauqua, Erie, Genesee, Monroe, Niagara and Orleans counties.

Note: There are now 62 counties in the State of New York. The counties which are not mentioned in this list had not yet been established, or sufficiently organized, the area being included in one or more of the abovementioned counties.

Members
The asterisk (*) denotes members of the previous Legislature who continued in office as members of this Legislature. Robert Denniston changed from the Assembly to the Senate.

Employees
 Clerk: Samuel G. Andrews
 Deputy Clerks: Friend W. Humphrey, William H. Rice
 Sergeant-at-Arms: Richard M. Meigs
 Doorkeeper: Philip M. De Zeng
 Assistant Doorkeeper: Chauncey Dexter

State Assembly

Districts

 Albany County (3 seats)
 Allegany County (2 seats)
 Broome County (1 seat)
 Cattaraugus County (2 seats)
 Cayuga County (3 seats)
 Chautauqua County (3 seats)
 Chemung County (1 seat)
 Chenango County (3 seats)
 Clinton County (1 seat)
 Columbia County (3 seats)
 Cortland County (2 seats)
 Delaware County (2 seats)
 Dutchess County (3 seats)
 Erie County (3 seats)
 Essex County (1 seat)
 Franklin County (1 seat)
 Fulton and Hamilton counties (1 seat)
 Genesee County (4 seats)
 Greene County (2 seats)
 Herkimer County (2 seats)
 Jefferson County (3 seats)
 Kings County (2 seats)
 Lewis County (1 seat)
 Livingston County (2 seats)
 Madison County (3 seats)
 Monroe County (3 seats)
 Montgomery County (2 seats)
 The City and County of New York (13 seats)
 Niagara County (2 seats)
 Oneida County (4 seats)
 Onondaga County (4 seats)
 Ontario County (3 seats)
 Orange County (3 seats)
 Orleans County (1 seat)
 Oswego County (2 seats)
 Otsego County (3 seats)
 Putnam County (1 seat)
 Queens County (1 seat)
 Rensselaer County (3 seats)
 Richmond County (1 seat)
 Rockland County (1 seat)
 St. Lawrence County (2 seats)
 Saratoga County (2 seats)
 Schenectady County (1 seat)
 Schoharie County (2 seats)
 Seneca County (1 seat)
 Steuben County (3 seats)
 Suffolk County (2 seats)
 Sullivan County (1 seat)
 Tioga County (1 seat)
 Tompkins County (2 seats)
 Ulster County (2 seats)
 Warren County (1 seat)
 Washington (2 seats)
 Wayne County (2 seats)
 Westchester County (2 seats)
 Yates County (1 seat)

Note: There are now 62 counties in the State of New York. The counties which are not mentioned in this list had not yet been established, or sufficiently organized, the area being included in one or more of the abovementioned counties.

Assemblymen
The asterisk (*) denotes members of the previous Legislature who continued as members of this Legislature.

Party affiliations follow the result given in The New Yorker.

Employees
 Clerk: Philander B. Prindle
 Sergeant-at-Arms: Daniel H. Bromley
 Doorkeeper: Joseph S. Lockwood
 Assistant Doorkeeper: Abiel W. Howard

Notes

Sources
 The New York Civil List compiled by Franklin Benjamin Hough (Weed, Parsons and Co., 1858) [pg. 109 and 441 for Senate districts; pg. 133 for senators; pg. 148f for Assembly districts; pg. 224f for assemblymen]
 Political History of the State of New York from January 1, 1841, to January 1, 1847, Vol III, including the Life of Silas Wright (Hall & Dickson, Syracuse NY, 1848; pg. 182 to 247)
 The Politician's Register published by Horace Greeley (1841; pg. 11f)

064
1841 in New York (state)
1841 U.S. legislative sessions